Nguessan Nadège Koffi (born 26 August 1989), known as Nadège Koffi, is an Ivorian former footballer who played as a midfielder. She has been a member of the Ivory Coast women's national team.

International career
Koffi capped for Ivory Coast at senior level during the 2012 African Women's Championship.

See also
List of Ivory Coast women's international footballers

References

1989 births
Living people
Women's association football midfielders
Ivorian women's footballers
Ivory Coast women's international footballers
People from Yamoussoukro